Richard Evans (born 19 June 1983) is a Welsh professional footballer. He has been capped by Wales U21s and is who plays for Chippenham Town.

Career

Evans began his career as a trainee with Birmingham City, but left having never made the first team. An injury-hit three-year spell at Sheffield Wednesday followed, in which he made just 10 appearances for the Yorkshire club, scoring a solitary goal against Burnley in the 47th minute of a 7–2 victory in the penultimate game of the 2002–03 season on 26 April 2003 at Turf Moor.

Evans made his Shrewsbury Town debut shortly after signing on a free transfer in the January 2006 transfer window, in a 2–1 Football League Two defeat to Notts County on 21 January 2006. A hamstring injury reduced his 2005–06 season to just six appearances.

Evans was released by Shrewsbury on 9 May 2006, having failed to prove his value to manager Gary Peters.

Evans was signed by Newport County three months later. He seemed to overcome his injury problems in his first season as he played 42 times, scoring three goals. Evans contract with Newport was cancelled in October 2008 by mutual consent. After his release, he signed with Bath City where he spent two seasons before moving to Haverfordwest County.

He is the younger brother of Mark Evans who played for Newport County in the 1990s.

In the summer of 2011 he joined Port Talbot Town but although he played in pre-season matches, he left on 31 August 2011 without playing a competitive game, deciding to join  Aberaman Athletic.

In February 2012 he joined Chippenham Town.

Honours
Bath City
 Conference South play-off winner: 2009–10

References

External links

1983 births
Birmingham City F.C. players
Sheffield Wednesday F.C. players
Shrewsbury Town F.C. players
Newport County A.F.C. players
Bath City F.C. players
Welsh footballers
Wales under-21 international footballers
Living people
English Football League players
Haverfordwest County A.F.C. players
Cymru Premier players
Port Talbot Town F.C. players
Aberaman Athletic F.C. players
Chippenham Town F.C. players
Association football midfielders